Alen Abramović (born 4 November 1976) is a Croatian cross-country skier. He competed in the 2006 Winter Olympics.

References

1976 births
Living people
Cross-country skiers at the 2006 Winter Olympics
Croatian male cross-country skiers
Olympic cross-country skiers of Croatia
Sportspeople from Rijeka